The Aqua Line is a name common to a number of rail systems around the world. It can refer to:

 Aqua Line (Noida Metro) Noida, Uttar Pradesh, India
 Aqua Line (Nagpur Metro) Nagpur, Maharashtra, India
 Aqua Line (Pune Metro) Pune, Maharashtra, India
 Canada Line Vancouver, British Columbia, Canada
 E Line (Los Angeles Metro) Los Angeles, California, United States of America
 Tokyo Bay Aqua-Line Tokyo Bay, Japan

See also
 Aqua (color)